The Amazons is the debut album by British alternative rock band, The Amazons. The album was released on 26 May 2017 through Fiction Records. The album debuted at number eight on the UK Album Charts.

Background 
Five singles were released prior to the album. The opening track "Stay With Me" featured on the soundtrack to the football simulation game, FIFA 18.

Track listing

Critical reception 

At Metacritic, which assigns a normalised rating out of 100 to reviews from mainstream publications, the album received an average score of 64, based on nine reviews, indicating "generally favorable reviews".

Charting

Personnel 
 Matt Thomson: Singer & Guitarist
 Chris Alderton: Guitarist 
 Elliot Briggs: Bass Player
 Joe Emmett: Drummer

References

External links 
 
 

2017 debut albums
Fiction Records albums
The Amazons (band) albums